James Carlton Brown (born March 1, 1960) is an American former professional ice hockey defenseman who played in three games with the Los Angeles Kings of the National Hockey League (NHL) in the 1982–83 season.

Career statistics

Regular season and playoffs

External links
 

1960 births
Living people
American men's ice hockey defensemen
Ice hockey people from Arizona
Ice hockey players from New York (state)
Los Angeles Kings draft picks
Los Angeles Kings players
New Haven Nighthawks players
Notre Dame Fighting Irish men's ice hockey players
People from Canton, New York
Sportspeople from Phoenix, Arizona